This is a list of cricketers who have represented South Australia in either a first-class, List A or Twenty20 match.

South Australia's inaugural first-class match commenced on 10 November 1877, against Tasmania at the Adelaide Oval, its first limited overs match on 30 November 1969, against Western Australia at the WACA Ground and its first Twenty20 match on 8 January 2006, against Victoria at the St Kilda Cricket Ground.

While some of the cricketers mentioned represented other teams the information included is for their career with South Australia.

Key
 First – Year of debut
 Last – Year of latest game
 Apps – Number of matches played
  – Player has represented Australia in a Test match, Limited Overs International or Twenty20 International match.
  – Player has represented a nation other than Australia in a Test match, Limited Overs International or Twenty20 International.

Cricketers

References

External links

Cricket in South Australia
South Australia cricketers
South Australia cricketers
Cricket
Cricketers